Wellington East was a provincial electoral riding in Ontario, Canada. From 1886 to 1926 it elected members to the Legislative Assembly of Ontario.

Members of the Legislative Assembly

References

Former provincial electoral districts of Ontario